James Luceno (born 1947) is an American author, known for his novels and reference books connected with the Star Wars franchise and the Star Wars Expanded Universe, and (with Brian Daley under the shared pseudonym Jack McKinney) novelizations of the Robotech animated television series. Luceno is also the author of several original novels along with film novelizations and other franchise tie-ins. He has also written for television cartoon series.

Star Wars
In the Star Wars universe he has written The New Jedi Order novels, Agents of Chaos: Hero's Trial, Agents of Chaos: Jedi Eclipse and The Unifying Force aswell as the prequel trilogy novels Darth Maul: Saboteur, Cloak of Deception, Labyrinth of Evil and Dark Lord: The Rise of Darth Vader. He also wrote a novel detailing the history of the Millennium Falcon and Star Wars: Revenge of the Sith: The Visual Dictionary.

In an interview with Star Wars Insider, Luceno said that he would like to write a future novel dealing with the search for immortality that both Qui-Gon Jinn and Darth Plagueis embarked upon in their own separate ways. However, in a talk show interview in February 2007, he indicated that the novel was currently on hold due to Star Wars expanded universe continuity concerns. The Darth Plagueis novel again became viable in 2009, and Star Wars: Darth Plagueis was released in January 2012.

Luceno's 2014 novel Star Wars: Tarkin was one of the first four novels published in the franchise after Lucasfilm redefined Star Wars continuity in April 2014. His novel Catalyst: A Rogue One Novel was published in November 2016.

Other work
Luceno wrote 1980's Headhunters, the tale of three Americans' adventure in South America, a place Luceno himself has traveled extensively.  He also authored A Fearful Symmetry, Rainchaser, Rock Bottom, and The Big Empty in 1993. Luceno wrote the novelizations of the films The Shadow and The Mask of Zorro. For The Young Indiana Jones Chronicles, Luceno penned 1992's The Mata Hari Affair. He is intermittently working on an autobiography.

He is also the author of the new Web Warrior series and co-author of the popular Robotech novelization series with his close friend Brian Daley. The pair wrote under the pseudonym Jack McKinney. Luceno wrote a tribute to Daley which is posted on Daley's website along with photos of the two of them. Daley and Luceno were also amongst a team of writers for the 1986 television cartoon series The Adventures of the Galaxy Rangers, created by Robert Mandell. Luceno alone also wrote two episodes for the 1995 cartoon series Princess Gwenevere and the Jewel Riders, also by Mandell.

Bibliography

Filmography

References

External links
 
 
 Bibliography at SciFan
 James Luceno at Fantastic Fiction

1947 births
American male screenwriters
20th-century American novelists
20th-century American short story writers
21st-century American novelists
21st-century American short story writers
American male novelists
American male short story writers
American science fiction writers
American television writers
Living people
American male television writers
20th-century American male writers
21st-century American male writers